Metaprotus asuridia is a moth in the family Crambidae. It was described by Arthur Gardiner Butler in 1886. It is found in Australia, where it has been recorded from Queensland.

References

Moths described in 1886
Pyraustinae